Interkosmos was a Soviet space program, designed to help the Soviet Union's allies with crewed and uncrewed space missions.

The program was formed in April 1967 in Moscow. All members of the program from USSR were given the Hero of the Soviet Union medal or the Order of Lenin. The program included the allied east-European states of the Warsaw Pact, Eastern Bloc, CoMEcon, and other socialist states like Afghanistan, Cuba, Mongolia, and Vietnam. In addition, pro-Soviet non-aligned states such as India and Syria participated, and even states such as the United Kingdom, France and Austria, despite them being capitalist states.

Following the Apollo–Soyuz, there were talks between NASA and Interkosmos in the 1970s about a "Shuttle-Salyut" program to fly Space Shuttle missions to a Salyut space station, with later talks in the 1980s even considering flights of the future Buran-class orbiter to a future US space station.
Whilst the Shuttle-Salyut program never materialized during the existence of the Soviet Interkosmos program, after the dissolution of the Soviet Union the Shuttle–Mir Program would follow in these footsteps in the mid-1990s and eventually pave the way to the International Space Station.

Beginning in April 1967 with unpiloted research satellite missions, the first crewed Interkosmos mission occurred in February 1978. So called joint crewed spaceflights enabled 14 non-Soviet cosmonauts to participate in Soyuz space flights between 1978 and 1988. The program was responsible for sending into space the first citizen of a country other than the USA or USSR: Vladimír Remek of Czechoslovakia. Interkosmos also resulted in the first black and Hispanic person in space, Arnaldo Tamayo Méndez of Cuba, and the first Asian person in space, Phạm Tuân of Vietnam. Of the countries involved, only Bulgaria sent two cosmonauts in space, although the second one did not fly under the Interkosmos program, and the French spationaut Jean-Loup Chrétien flew on two separate flights.

The Soviet Union also made offers of joint human spaceflight on a commercial basis to the United Kingdom and Japan resulting in the first British and Japanese cosmonauts. In the early 1980s, an offer was made to Finland as well, with test pilot Jyrki Laukkanen mentioned as one of the potential Finnish cosmonauts. The pilots of the Test Flight (Koelentue) refused on the grounds that participation would not benefit the Flight or test pilot activity in any way. No further offers were made to Finland regarding the matter.

Crewed missions

Uncrewed missions

 1970 November 28 -  Vertikal-1 Aeronomy/Ionosphere/Solar mission.
 1971 August 20 - Vertikal-2 Solar Ultraviolet/Solar X-ray mission.
 1972 April 7 - Interkosmos 6 - Investigation of primary cosmic radiation and meteoritic particles in near-earth outer space.
 1973 April 4 - Interkosmos 9 "Copernicus-500" - satellite of cooperation of the Polish People's Republic and Soviet Union to study the Sun and ionosphere. Orbit around 200–1550 km.
 1975 June 3 - Interkosmos 14
 1975 September 2 - Vertikal-3 Solar Ultraviolet/Solar X-ray mission.
 1976 - Re-entry Vehicle Test mission.
 1976 June 19 - Interkosmos 15. Testing of new systems and components of satellite under space flight conditions.
 1977 March 29 -  Investigation of the upper atmosphere and outer space.
 1977 June 17 - Signe 3 - Twenty French specialists worked on the satellite.
 1977 August 30 - Vertikal-5 Solar Ultraviolet/Solar X-ray mission.
 1977 September 24 - Interkosmos 17 - Investigation of energetic charged and neutral particles and micrometeorite fluxes in circumterrestrial space.
 1977 October 25 - Vertikal-6 Ionosphere/Solar mission?.
 1978 October 24 - Interkosmos 18 - Conduct of complex investigations on the interaction between the magnetosphere and ionosphere of the earth. Cooperation with the Czechoslovak Socialist Republic, the German Democratic Republic, the Hungarian People's Republic, the Polish People's Republic, and the Socialist Republic of Romania.
 1978 October 24 - Magion 1 - The Czechoslovak satellite MAGION was launched into orbit by the Soviet spacecraft Interkosmos 18
 1978 November 3 - Vertikal-7 Ionosphere/Solar mission
 1979 February 27 - Interkosmos 19 - Cooperation with the People's Republic of Bulgaria, the Czechoslovak Socialist Republic, the Hungarian People's Republic, and the Polish People's Republic.
 1979 September 26 - Vertikal-8 Solar Ultraviolet/Solar X-ray mission.
 1979 November 1 - Interkosmos 20. (Czechoslovak Socialist Republic, the German Democratic Republic, the Hungarian People's Republic, and the Socialist Republic of Romania).
 1981 - Re-entry Vehicle Test mission.
 
 1981 February 6 - Interkosmos 21 - (Czechoslovak Socialist Republic, the German Democratic Republic, the Hungarian People's Republic, and the Socialist Republic of Romania)
 1981 August 7 - Interkosmos 22 "Bulgaria-1300" (People's Republic of Bulgaria).
 1981 August 28 - Vertikal-9 Solar Ultraviolet/Solar X-ray mission.
 1981 September 21 - Oreol 3 - Developed by Soviet and French specialists under the joint Soviet-French project 'Arkad-3'.
 1985 April 26 - Interkosmos 23 - Developed by scientists and specialists of the USSR and the Czechoslovak Socialist Republic.
 1986 December 18 - Kosmos 1809
 1989 September 28 - Magion 2 -  Magion 2 forms a part of the scientific programme of Interkosmos 24 (project Aktivnyj) Execution of the scientific programme of the 'Aktivny' project in conjunction with Interkosmos-24, permitting simultaneous spatially separating investigations of plasma processes in circumterrestrial space.
 1989 September 28 - Interkosmos 24 - US participation, in cooperation with Bulgaria, Czechoslovakia, the German Democratic Republic, Hungary, Poland, and Romania (the international scientific project entitled 'Aktivny'). Carrying the Czechoslovak Magion-2 satellite.
 1991 December 18 - Interkosmos 25 -  experiments from Germany, Romania, Bulgaria, Poland, Hungary. Comprehensive study of the effects of artificial impact of modulated electron flows and plasma beams on the ionosphere and magnetosphere of the Earth (forming part of the Apex international scientific project, conducted jointly with Bulgaria, Czechoslovakia, Germany, Hungary, Poland, and Romania.)
 1991 December 28 - Magion 3 
 1994 March 2 - Interkosmos 26 - Conduct of comprehensive investigations of the sun under the Coronas-I international project developed by Russian and Ukrainian experiments in cooperation with specialists from Poland, the Czech Republic, the Slovak Republic, Bulgaria, France, and the United Kingdom.

Films
In general, most of the films associated with programs are propaganda short TV documentaries from that era. The two exceptions include (largely fictionalised) Interkosmos from 2006, and cooperation document from 2009 (in Polish) titled Lotnicy Kosmonauci ("Aviators-Cosmonauts").

See also

 Bion satellites, a series of biology research satellites from 1966 to 1996 – participation of the United States from 1975 to 1996.
 Vega 1 and Vega 2, two Solar System probes, in the joint Vega program between the Soviet Union, Austria, Bulgaria, Hungary, Poland, Czechoslovakia, France, the German Democratic Republic ("East Germany"), and the Federal Republic of Germany ("West Germany") in December 1984.

References

External links

 
 Interkosmos: The Eastern Bloc's Early Space Program
 A Dictionary of Space Exploration
 Intercosmos

Interkosmos program
Space program of the Soviet Union
Foreign relations of the Soviet Union
Eastern Bloc
East Germany–Soviet Union relations
Poland–Soviet Union relations
Hungary–Soviet Union relations
Czechoslovakia–Soviet Union relations
Cuba–Soviet Union relations
Romania–Soviet Union relations
Soviet Union–Syria relations
India–Soviet Union relations
Afghanistan–Soviet Union relations
Soviet Union–Vietnam relations
Bulgaria–Soviet Union relations
1970s in spaceflight
1980s in spaceflight